The first season of the American television sitcom The Nanny aired on CBS from November 3, 1993, to May 16, 1994. The series was created by actress Fran Drescher and her then-husband Peter Marc Jacobson, and developed by Prudence Fraser and Robert Sternin. Produced by Sternin and Fraser Ink Inc. and TriStar Television, the series features Drescher, Jacobson, Fraser, Sternin, Caryn Lucas and Diane Wilk as executive producers. Most of the season's episodes aired on Wednesdays at 8:30 pm while the first few aired on Wednesdays at 8:00 pm.

Based on an idea inspired by Drescher's visit with a friend and The Sound of Music, the season revolves around Fran Fine, a Jewish woman from Flushing, Queens, New York, who is hired by a wealthy Broadway producer to be the nanny to his three children. Drescher stars as the titular character, Charles Shaughnessy as British-born producer Maxwell Sheffield, and the children – Maggie, Brighton and Grace – portrayed by Nicholle Tom, Benjamin Salisbury, and Madeline Zima. The series also features Daniel Davis as Niles, the family butler, and Lauren Lane as C.C. Babcock, Maxwell's associate in his production company who is smitten with him. Several recurring characters also played a role in the sitcom's plotlines, many of whom were related to Fran.

The Nanny first season debuted to moderate numbers and ratings for the channel, maintaining most of the initial audience through the season's broadcast. The season finale, however, generated a large increase in ratings, garnering the second highest rating for season behind the fifth episode "Here Comes the Brood", with 20.3 million viewers. The season was released on DVD by Sony Pictures Home Entertainment in 2005, nearly 12 years after its premiere.

Production

Concept
The concept for The Nanny came into fruition during Drescher's trip to France and the United Kingdom. In France, Drescher lived with a family and observed the family's life with a Guatemalan nanny. After leaving France, Drescher left for the United Kingdom to visit close friend, model and former Princesses co-star Twiggy. While there, Drescher spent time with Twiggy and her husband Leigh Lawson's children. Drescher noted how she felt out of place in the country: "Everything was so English, so proper. I felt like this loud New Yorker, so crude, so blue collar, so Jewish." Drescher called her husband, producer Peter Marc Jacobson, and told him her idea of "a takeoff of The Sound of Music, only I come through the door instead of Julie Andrews."

Development
Drescher had previously starred in the television sitcom Princesses on CBS in 1991. The series, spearheaded by Jeff Sagansky, was plagued with rumors of behind the scenes drama. The series' launch underperformed and after only five episodes amidst declining ratings, CBS canceled the show. Drescher met up  with Sagansky during her flight to France and arranged for her and Jacobson to pitch an idea for CBS. After her trip to France and visit with Twiggy, Drescher told her idea to her husband, who stated "That's an idea that will sell." Four months later, the series was put into pre-production with Drescher and Jacobson signed on as writers and executive producers.

In January 1994, the season received a full season pickup.

Cast and characters

Main
 Fran Drescher as Fran Fine
 Charles Shaughnessy as Maxwell Sheffield
 Daniel Davis as Niles
 Lauren Lane as Chastity Claire "C.C" Babcock
 Nicholle Tom as Maggie Sheffield
 Benjamin Salisbury as Brighton Sheffield
 Madeline Zima as Grace Sheffield

Recurring
 Renée Taylor as Sylvia Fine
 Rachel Chagall as Val Toriello
 Ann Morgan Guilbert as Yetta Rosenberg

Special guest stars
 Carol Channing as herself
 Cloris Leachman as Clara Mueller
 Lesley-Anne Down as Chloe Simpson
 Twiggy as Jocelyn Sheffield
 Leigh Lawson as Lester
 Dan Aykroyd as Repair Man
 Rita Moreno as Mrs. Wickervich Stone
 Robert Culp as Stewart Babcock
 Patti LaBelle as herself

Guest stars
 Jonathan Penner as Danny Imperialli
 Jimmy Marsden as Eddie
 Dorothy Lyman as Maureen Wentworth
 Nikki Cox as Cindy Wentworth
 Nancy Frangione as Marsha Rosenberg
 Ian Abercrombie as Butler Inspector #1
 Brian George as Butler Inspector #2
 Zack Norman as Jack Rosenberg
 Cristine Rose as Dr. Bort
 Allan Rich as Pauly the pawnbroker
 Stephen Nichols as Brock Storm
 Matt McCoy as Steve Mintz
 Maree Cheatham as Emma Trusdale
 Marianne Muellerleile as Andrea's mother
 Tina Hart as Andrea
 Anthony Cistaro as Carlo
 Andy Dick as Pepé / Bernie
 Louis Guss as Irving Koenig
 Jackie Tohn as Tiffany Koenig
 Doug Ballard as Doctor Link
 Francesca P. Roberts as Nurse Smith
 Gregg Rogell as Kenny Keroucan
 Lane Davies as Nigel, Duke of Salisbury
 Eric Braeden as Frank Bradley
 Miko Hughes as Frank Bradley Jr.
 Leann Hunley as Bobbi Jo
 Miriam Flynn as country club manager

Episodes

Home media

References

External links
 

1993 American television seasons
1994 American television seasons
The Nanny